Basman may refer to:

 Michael Basman (born 1946), English chess player and master
 Joel Basman (born 1990), Swiss actor
 Basman district, Amman, Jordan